The women's 57 kg competition at the 2012 Summer Olympics was held on 9 August, at the ExCeL Exhibition Centre.

Competition format
The competition was held in a partial double-elimination format.

The main bracket consisted of a single elimination tournament, culminating in the gold medal match. 

Two bronze medals were awarded at the Taekwondo competitions. A second repechage bracket was used to determine the bronze medal winners. Every competitor who lost to one of the two finalists competed in the repechage, again in single-elimination competition. Each semifinal loser faced the last remaining repechage competitor from the opposite half of the bracket in a bronze medal match.

Schedule 
All times are British Summer Time (UTC+1)

Results

On 13 July 2012, the World Taekwondo Federation released the provisional draw which included the top eight seeds for the competition. The remainder of the qualified athletes were randomly drawn on 6 August 2012.

Repechage
Every competitor who lost to one of the two finalists competed in the repechage, another single-elimination competition. Each semifinal loser faced the last remaining repechage competitor from the opposite half of the bracket in a bronze medal match.

References

Results 

Women's 57 kg
Olymp
Women's events at the 2012 Summer Olympics